Anatemnus is a genus of pseudoscorpions.

Species
The genus contains the following species:
 Anatemnus angustus Redikorzev, 1938
 Anatemnus chaozhouensis Hu & Zhang, 2012
 Anatemnus elongatus (Ellingsen, 1902)
 Anatemnus javanus (Thorell, 1883)
 Anatemnus luzonicus Beier, 1932
 Anatemnus madecassus Beier, 1932
 Anatemnus megasoma (Daday, 1897)
 Anatemnus nilgiricus Beier, 1932
 Anatemnus novaguineensis (With, 1908)
 Anatemnus orites (Thorell, 1889)
 Anatemnus oswaldi (Tullgren, 1907)
 Anatemnus pugilatorius Beier, 1965
 Anatemnus reni Gao & Zhang, 2016
 Anatemnus rotundus (With, 1906)
 Anatemnus seychellesensis Beier, 1940
 Anatemnus subindicus (Ellingsen, 1910)
 Anatemnus subvastus Alexander, Burger & Harvey, 2014
 Anatemnus subvermiformis Redikorzev, 1938
 Anatemnus tonkinensis Beier, 1943
 Anatemnus vermiformis (With, 1906)
 Anatemnus voeltzkowi (Ellingsen, 1908)

Anatemnus longus Beier, 1932 is a synonym of Anatemnus voeltzkowi (With, 1906).

References 

Cheliferoidea
Atemnidae
Pseudoscorpion genera